Lateef Olalekan Kayode (born March 3, 1983) is a Nigerian professional boxer who challenged for the WBA cruiserweight title in 2015.

Professional career
On December 3, 2010 Kayode knocked out American Edward Charles Perry on a Showtime boxing card. Kayode showed a much more relaxed demeanor in the ring than in his previous ShoBox appearances. In the 6th round he perfectly placed a right hand down the pipe that connected on the left side of Perry’s jaw, sending him sprawling to the ground once more. Perry had never touched the canvas in 13 years as a professional.

On June 10, 2011, Kayode proved too much for Matt Godfrey at the Chumash Resort Casino. Kayode controlled the entire fight and sent Godfrey to the canvas a total of three times, eventually winning by scores of 98-90, 97-90, 98-89. He knocked Godfrey to the floor in rounds one, five and nine with a devastating display of body shots and power punches to the head. Kayode was brutally knocked out by Denis Lebedev in his last fight.

Professional boxing record

|-  style="text-align:center; background:#e3e3e3;"
|  style="border-style:none none solid solid; "|Res.
|  style="border-style:none none solid solid; "|Record
|  style="border-style:none none solid solid; "|Opponent
|  style="border-style:none none solid solid; "|Type
|  style="border-style:none none solid solid; "|Rd., Time
|  style="border-style:none none solid solid; "|Date
|  style="border-style:none none solid solid; "|Location
|  style="border-style:none none solid solid; "|Notes
|- align=center
|Loss
|21–4
|align=left|Aleksey Egorov
|
|
|
|align=left|
|align=left|
|- align=center
|Loss
|21–3
|align=left|Andrew Tabiti
|
|
|
|align=left|

|- align=center
|Loss
|21–2
|align=left|Keith Tapia
|
|
|
|align=left|
|align=left|
|- align=center
|Loss
|21–1
|align=left|Denis Lebedev
|
|
|
|align=left|
|align=left|
|- align=center
|Win
|align=center|21–0||align=left|Nick Kisner	
|
|
|
|align=left|
|align=left|
|- align=center
|style="background:#ddd;"|NC
|align=center|20–0||align=left|Luis Ortiz
|
|
|
|align=left|
|align=left|
|- align=center
|Win
|align=center|20–0||align=left|Jonte Willis
|
|
|
|align=left|
|align=left|
|- align=center
|Win
|align=center|19–0||align=left|Travis Fulton
|
|
|
|align=left|
|align=left|
|- align=center
|style="background:#ddd;"|NC
|align=center|18–0||align=left|Antonio Tarver
|
|
|
|align=left|
|align=left|
|- align=center
|Win
|align=center|18–0||align=left|Felix Cora, Jr.
|
|
|
|align=left|
|align=left|
|- align=center
|Win
|align=center|17–0||align=left|Matt Godfrey
|
|
|
|align=left|
|align=left|
|- align=center
|Win
|align=center|16–0||align=left|Nicholas Iannuzzi
|
|
|
|align=left|
|align=left|
|- align=center
|Win
|align=center|15–0||align=left|Ed Perry
|
|
|
|align=left|
|align=left|
|- align=center
|Win
|align=center|14–0||align=left|Epifanio Mendoza
|
|
|
|align=left|
|align=left|
|- align=center
|Win
|align=center|13–0||align=left|Alfredo Escalera Jr.
|
|
|
|align=left|
|align=left|
|- align=center
|Win
|align=center|12–0||align=left|Jose Luis Herrera
|
|
|
|align=left|
|align=left|
|- align=center
|Win
|align=center|11–0||align=left|Chris Thomas
|
|
|
|align=left|
|align=left|
|- align=center
|Win
|align=center|10–0||align=left|Chris Thomas
|
|
|
|align=left|
|align=left|
|- align=center
|Win
|align=center|9–0||align=left|Billy Willis
|
|
|
|align=left|
|align=left|
|- align=center
|Win
|align=center|8–0||align=left|Leo Bercier
|
|
|
|align=left|
|align=left|
|- align=center
|Win
|align=center|7–0||align=left|Francisco Mireles
|
|
|
|align=left|
|align=left|
|- align=center
|Win
|align=center|6–0||align=left|Marcus Dickerson
|
|
|
|align=left|
|align=left|
|- align=center
|Win
|align=center|5–0||align=left|Ethan Cox
|
|
|
|align=left|
|align=left|
|- align=center
|Win
|align=center|4–0||align=left|Jamiah Williamson
|
|
|
|align=left|
|align=left|
|- align=center
|Win
|align=center|3–0||align=left|Octavius Davis
|
|
|
|align=left|
|align=left|
|- align=center
|Win
|align=center|2–0||align=left|Mike Finney
|
|
|
|align=left|
|align=left|
|- align=center
|Win
|align=center|1–0||align=left|Mike Miller
|
|
|
|align=left|
|align=left|
|- align=center

References

External links

1983 births
Yoruba sportspeople
Cruiserweight boxers
Living people
Nigerian male boxers
African Games silver medalists for Nigeria
African Games medalists in boxing
Competitors at the 2007 All-Africa Games